Man of Sorrows may refer to:

Man of Sorrows, a devotional image of Jesus in the passion, often shown wearing a crown of thorns
Man of Sorrows (Geertgen tot Sint Jans)
The Man of Sorrows from the New Town Hall in Prague, painted wood statue, 1410s
Man of Sorrows (Maarten van Heemskerck)
The Man of Sorrows (James Ensor)

See also
"Man of Constant Sorrow", American folk song
"Man of Sorrows" (Bruce Dickinson song), 1997
Man of Sorrows (musical), a 1972 Australian musical with music by Enzo Toppano and lyrics by Peggy Mortimer and Lorrae Desmond